2003 Elections to Fife Council were held on 1 May 2003, the same day as the other Scottish local government elections and the Scottish Parliament election. The election was the last one to use plurality (first past the post) system of election to elected the  78 individual councillors.

Party performance
Labour continued to control the council as a minority, having only 38 seats going into the election.  Labour won 43 seats in 1999 elections but lost 5 seats in by-elections during the course of their term in office, but remained having the largest share of the vote and numbers of councillors. SNP, Liberal Democrats and independents all increase there share of the vote and number of councillors.

Election results

Turnout was  46.2%

Ward results
In Order of the ward numbers:

Wards no1: Kincardine, Culross and Low Valleyfield

Blairhall, High Valleyfield and Torryburn

Oakley, Saline and Steelend

Cairneyhill, Carnock and Milesmark

Crossford and Dunfermline Central

Baldridgeburn

Wellwood and Headwell

Townhill and Bellyeoman

Garvock and Carnegie

Halbeath, Hill of Beath and Kingseat

Woodmill

Linburn

Brucefield and Nethertown

Ward No. 14 Pitcorthie

Limekilns and Pitreavie

Rosyth West

Rosyth East

Inverkeithing West and Rosyth South

Inverkeithing East and North Queensferry

Dalgety Bay West and Hillend

Dalgety Bay East

Ward no22: Crossgates and Moss-side

Cowdenbeath Central

Oakfield and Cowdenbeath North

Kelty

Ward No26: Ballingry and Lochore

Crosshill and Lochgelly North

Lumphinnans and Lochgelly South

Aberdour and Burntisland West

Auchtertool and Burntisland East

Kinghorn and Invertiel

Linktown and Kirkcaldy Central

Raith and Longbraes

Bennochy and Valley

Templehall East

Templehall West

Cardenden, Cluny and Chapel

Kinglassie, Bowhill and Dundonald

Dunnikier

Hayfield and Balsusney

Smeaton and Overton

Glebe Park, Pathhead and Sinclairtown

Dysart and Gallatown

Wemyss and Muiredge

Buckhaven and Denbeath

Methilhill

Methil

Leven East

Leven West and Kirkland

Ward No50: Kennoway

Windygates, Star and Balgonie

Markinch and Woodside East

Auchmuty and Woodside West

Pitteuchar and Finglassie North

Thornton, Stenton and Finglassie South

Caskieberran and Rimbleton

Newcastle and Tanshall

South Parks and Macedonia

Leslie and Whinnyknowe

Ward No60: Balgeddie and Collydean

Cadham, Pitcoudie and Balfarg

Falkland, Freuchie and Strathmiglo

Auchtermuchty and Ladybank

Kettle, Springfield and Ceres

Cupar North

Cupar South

Newburgh and Tay Coast

Newport-on-Tay and Wormit

Tayport and Motray

Ward No70: Leuchars, Balmullo and Guardbridge

Strathkinness and St Andrews West

St Andrews Central

St Andrews South

St Andrews South East

Crail, Cameron and Kemback

Anstruther and East Neuk Landward

Elie, St Monans and Pittenweem

Largo

Subsequent by-elections

2005 – Auchtertool and Burntisland East

References

External links

2003 Scottish local elections
2003
21st century in Fife
May 2003 events in the United Kingdom